Nesbygda is a village in the municipality of Svelvik, Norway, located north of the Svelvik town. Its population (SSB 2005) is 947.

Villages in Vestfold og Telemark